Maharani Pakshalika Singh bhadawar  is an Indian politician from Uttar Pradesh. and Member of 18th Uttar Pradesh Assembly Election.

Personal life
Her husband's name is Raja Mahendra Aridaman Singh.

Education
She became graduate from Women's Christian College Madras in 1981.

Political life
2017: Elected as Member of Legislative Assembly of Uttar Pradesh from Bah (Assembly constituency) as Bharatiya Janta Party candidate. She got 80,567 votes in this election.

References

Living people
People from Agra district
Uttar Pradesh MLAs 2017–2022
Bharatiya Janata Party politicians from Uttar Pradesh
Year of birth missing (living people)
Uttar Pradesh MLAs 2022–2027